Kosswigianella is a genus of delphacid planthoppers in the family Delphacidae. There are at least 10 described species in Kosswigianella.

Species

 Kosswigianella analis (Crawford, 1914)
 Kosswigianella denticauda (Boheman, 1847)
 Kosswigianella exigua (Boheman, 1847)
 Kosswigianella irrutilo Hamilton, 2002
 Kosswigianella kirgizorum (Anufriev, 2002)
 Kosswigianella (Kosswigianella) emeljanovi (Wilson, 1992)
 Kosswigianella (Kosswigianella) lutulentoides (Beamer, 1948)
 Kosswigianella (Kosswigianella) perusta (Beamer, 1947)
 Kosswigianella lutulenta (Van Duzee, 1897)
 Kosswigianella spinosus (Fieber, 1866)
 Kosswigianella transuralica (Anufriev, 1977)
 Kosswigianella wasatchi Hamilton, 2002

References

 Hamilton, K. G. Andrew (2002). "Homoptera (Insecta) in Pacific Northwest grasslands. Part 1 - New and revised taxa of leafhoppers and planthoppers (Cicadellidae and Delphacidae)". Journal of the Entomological Society of British Columbia, vol. 99, 2-31.
 Wagner, Wilhelm (1962). "Dynamische Taxionomie, angewandt auf die Delphaciden Mitteleuropas". Mitteilungen aus dem Hamburgischen Zoologischen Museum und Institut, vol. 60, 111–180.

Further reading

External links

 NCBI Taxonomy Browser, Kosswigianella

Auchenorrhyncha genera
Delphacini